STAYC is a South Korean girl group formed in 2020.

StayC or STAYC may also refer to:

 Star to a Young Culture, the debut single album by STAYC
 Stay-C, a 2011 studio album by Malaysian singer Stacy

See also 

 Stay (disambiguation)
Stay Cool
Stay Close
Stacy (disambiguation)
STAC (disambiguation)